This is a list of places named for Israel Putnam, a major general in the Continental Army who fought at the Battle of Bunker Hill.

Putnam, Connecticut
Putnam County, Georgia
Putnam County, Illinois
Putnam County, Indiana
Putnam County, Missouri
Putnam County, New York
Putnam, New York (town)
Putnam County, Ohio (some sources say it was named for his cousin Rufus Putnam)
Putnam County, Tennessee
Putnam County, West Virginia
Putnam County, Florida (It is not certain as to whether this one was named for Israel Putnam. There is also a possibility that it was named for Benjamin A. Putnam,'  an officer in the First Seminole War and local Florida politician.)''
Putnam Place, Bronx, New York

Putnam, Israel place names
Putnam